Purple People Eaters were the defensive line of the Minnesota Vikings from the late 1960s to the late 1970s. The term is a reference to a popular song from 1958, the efficiency of the defense, and the color of their uniforms. The motto of the Purple People Eaters was "Meet at the quarterback."

 Defensive tackle Alan Page, 9 Pro Bowl selections (1968–1976), NFL MVP (1971), Pro Football Hall of Fame
 Defensive end Carl Eller, 6 Pro Bowl selections (1968–1971, 1973–1974), Pro Football Hall of Fame
 Defensive end Jim Marshall, 2 Pro Bowl selections (1968–1969)
 Defensive tackle Gary Larsen, 2 Pro Bowl selections (1969–1970)

Larsen was replaced in 1974 by Doug Sutherland.

Marshall said that the players disliked the name "Purple People Eaters" and called themselves "The Purple Gang", but "we've got to ride with it because it's our handle". The group was a major factor in the post-season success of the Vikings from the late 1960s through the 1970s. The Purple People Eaters were one of the most identifiable front fours in National Football League history, with the "Fearsome Foursome" of the Los Angeles Rams during the 1960s and early 1970s, the "Steel Curtain" of the Pittsburgh Steelers during the 1970s, the "New York Sack Exchange" of the New York Jets during the 1980s, and the 1985 Chicago Bears "Monsters of the Midway".

Eller and Page were inducted into the Pro Football Hall of Fame. Many fans, players, coaches and sportswriters argue that Jim Marshall should be in the Hall of Fame as well.

Building the Purple People Eaters
When the Minnesota Vikings first came into the NFL in 1961, they picked up Jim Marshall from the Cleveland Browns during a number of early September trades that moved six Cleveland players to the Vikings for two 1962 draft picks. In 1964, Carl Eller was drafted in the first round. In the next season, they acquired Gary Larsen from the Los Angeles Rams. Then in 1967, the Vikings drafted Alan Page in the first round.

Late 1960s and early 1970s
From 1968, the Purple People Eaters were a key part of a Vikings team that won 10 division titles in 11 years, leading to five NFC Championships and four Super Bowl appearances. In 1968, Marshall, Eller and Page all made the Pro Bowl as the defense collected 44 sacks, ranked 6th in the league in points allowed and played a big role in the Vikings winning their first division title. In week 2 against the Green Bay Packers, Marshall sacked Packers Quarterback Bart Starr in his own end zone for a safety, giving the Vikings a 16–0 lead. The Vikings won the game 26–13.

In 1969, Marshall, Eller, Page and Larsen all made the Pro Bowl as the defense sacked the opposing quarterback 49 times and ranked number 1 in both points allowed and yards allowed. On Thanksgiving against the Detroit Lions, Marshall and Page combined for one of the most remarkable plays in NFL history. Page tipped a pass which fell into the hands of Marshall, who then started running towards the end zone. Then, as Marshall was being tackled, he lateraled the ball to Page who then had an easy path to the end zone. The Vikings won the game 27–0. In the Western Conference championship game, the Vikings hosted the Los Angeles Rams. Early in the game, Eller intercepted Rams quarterback Roman Gabriel and ran 46 yards into the end zone, but the touchdown was called back on a controversial offside penalty on Page. Marshall claimed in an interview that "Alan was not offsides, he was just really quick." Late in the fourth quarter, the Vikings defense needed to protect a one-point lead. Eller extended the lead by sacking Gabriel in the end zone for a safety. The Rams got the ball back with still some time left to win, but Page made up for his earlier penalty by intercepting Gabriel to put the game out of reach as the Vikings won 23–20. The win allowed the Vikings to advance to their first-ever NFL Championship against the Cleveland Browns. The Vikings dominated the game defeating the Browns 27–7. The Vikings advanced to Super Bowl IV but lost to the Kansas City Chiefs in a 23–7 upset.

The Vikings opened up the 1970 season in a Super Bowl IV rematch against the Chiefs. The Vikings set the tone early in the second quarter when Marshall recovered a fumble and then lateraled the ball to Roy Winston, who went on to score a touchdown and give the Vikings a 10–0 lead. The Vikings defense dominated the game, limiting the Chiefs to 63 yards rushing and forcing four turnovers en route to a 27–10 victory. In a week 4 game against the Chicago Bears, all four down linemen hit Bears quarterback Jack Concannon, forcing a fumble which was recovered by Page who then returned it 65 yards for a touchdown. The Vikings won the game 24–0. Late in the first half in a week 6 game against the Los Angeles Rams, The Vikings defense had their backs against the wall when the Rams had the ball at the Vikings 2-yard line after a 50-yard punt return by Kermit Alexander. However, the Vikings defense executed a key goal line stand by limiting the Rams to 1 yard on three straight running plays. The Vikings went on to win the game 13–3. The Vikings defense recorded 49 sacks in 1970 and once again gave up the fewest points and the fewest yards. Meanwhile, Page, Eller and Larsen all made the Pro Bowl. Page also led the league with seven fumble recoveries for 77 yards and a touchdown. Page also picked off Dallas Cowboys quarterback Roger Staubach and returned it 27 yards in week 5. Marshall hit Staubach as he threw it and the Vikings went on to win the game 54–13. 

In 1971, The Vikings defense ranked second in fewest yards allowed and for the third year in a row, first in fewest points allowed. That year, Eller was voted NEA NFL Defensive Player of the Year and to his fourth straight Pro Bowl. Meanwhile, Page became the first defensive player to be voted NFL MVP, and the only defensive lineman to ever earn the honor. Page's MVP season was highlighted by his Week 13 performance against the Detroit Lions. In the second quarter, after being called for a personal foul and for roughing the passer on consecutive plays, Page sacked QB Greg Landry on first down. On second down, Page tackled Altie Taylor for a 4-yard loss. On third down, Page tackled Landry after a gain of two yards, ending the drive. In the fourth quarter, Page blocked a Lion punt out of the end zone for a safety. Page got another safety when he tackled Buffalo Bills quarterback Dennis Shaw in his own endzone back in week 3. The Vikings won the game 19–0.

Three Super Bowls in four years

With the Vikings intimidating line leading their defense and their future Hall of Fame quarterback Fran Tarkenton leading the offense, the Vikings went on to participate in Super Bowls VIII, IX, and XI, though the Vikings lost each one. In 1973, Eller became an All Pro for the fifth time in six years. Page meanwhile was named NEA Defensive Player of the Year as the Vikings returned to the Super Bowl for the second time in five years, ultimately falling to the Miami Dolphins by a score of 24-7.

In 1974, Doug Sutherland started in place of Larsen and continued for the next seven years. Sutherland went on to start in Super Bowl IX as the Vikings were once again NFC Champions. Larsen retired after the 1974 season, thus making Super Bowl IX his last game, a 16-6 loss to the Pittsburgh Steelers.

In 1975, Page made his eighth consecutive Pro Bowl as the Vikings' defense recorded 46 sacks and became the first defense since the 1970 merger to be ranked number one against the run and the pass en route to winning another division title.

In 1976, The Vikings won another divisional title and made it to their third Super Bowl in four years and fourth overall. But for the fourth time, they lost, this time to the Oakland Raiders by a score of 32-14. That year, Page accounted for 18 of the Vikings 45 sacks and made his 9th consecutive Pro Bowl.

In 1977, The Vikings won yet another division title and made it to their fourth NFC Championship in five years. That year, Eller accounted for 15 of the Vikings 30 sacks. Eller also recorded a safety in week 2 against the Tampa Bay Buccaneers when he sacked Buccaneers quarterback Randy Hedberg in his own endzone en route to a 9–3 victory.

Retirement
Alan Page played for the Vikings until 1978 where six games in he was waived and then signed by the Chicago Bears, who he played for until he retired after the 1981 season. He was voted into the Pro Football Hall of Fame in 1988. After retirement Page became an attorney until 1992, when he was elected to the Minnesota Supreme Court, the first African-American to do so. He was re-elected 3 more times until his retirement in 2015 when turned 70, reaching the mandatory retirement age. In 2018 he was awarded the Presidential Medal of Freedom. 

Carl Eller also played with the Vikings until 1978, and one more season with the Seattle Seahawks before retiring after the 1979 season. He was inducted into the Pro Football Hall of Fame in 2004. About a decade later Eller went on to found various substance-abuse clinics in the Twin Cities area, named Triumph Life Centers. He acquired a degree in Human Services from Metropolitan State University in 1994. In 2020 Eller partnered with Halberd Corporation in work related to impact caused brain injuries such as PTSD and CTE.

Jim Marshall retired after the 1979 season with the Vikings, completing his 20th season, only missing 5 total games (all in his rookie year). Marshall was a finalist for the Pro Football Hall of Fame in 2004. In his last home game against the Buffalo Bills, Marshall collected two sacks and was carried off the field by his teammates in celebration. The Vikings won the game 10–3.

Gary Larsen retired in 1974 after 10 seasons with the Vikings.

Doug Sutherland remained with the Vikings until 1981 when he (like Eller) spent his last season with the Seahawks before retiring.

Along with Page and Eller being inducted to the Hall of Fame, the Purple People Eaters received several franchise accolades. Marshall, Eller and Page have been inducted the Vikings Ring of Honor, The Vikings retired numbers 88 and 70 to Page and Marshall respectively, Eller, Larsen, Page and Marshall were selected to the Vikings 25th Anniversary team, Eller, Page and Marshall were selected to the Vikings 40th Anniversary team, and Eller, Larsen, Page, Marshall and Sutherland were selected to be part of the 50 Greatest Vikings.

References

Minnesota Vikings
Nicknamed groups of American football players